Dryhill is an  geological Site of Special Scientific Interest on the western outskirts of Sevenoaks in Kent.

This former quarry exposes rocks dating to the Aptian stage in the early Cretaceous, around 120 million years ago. It is famous for its rich and diverse brachiopod and bivalve fossils, which are important for palaeoecological research.

There is access from Dryhill Lane.

References

Local Nature Reserves in Kent
Sites of Special Scientific Interest in Kent
Geological Conservation Review sites